Ouroube Sports Club is a Syrian sports club based in Aleppo, best known for their football team and basketball teams (men and women). Founded in 1923, Ouroube is the oldest sports organization in Syria. The club is part of the Antranik Youth Association, which is a sports program of the AGBU organization. In general, 5 types of sports are being practiced by the club.

History
The club was founded as al-Ahd al-Jadid in 1923 by Armenian refugees and survivors of the Armenian genocide. 

Two minor sport clubs -Istiqlal and al-Mish'al- were also founded by the Armenians of Aleppo in 1930 and 1931 respectively. Al-Ahd al-Jadid and Istiqlal were specialized in football while al-Mish'al was a basketball club. Finally in 1971, the three clubs were merged into one sports organization to form the Ouroube Sports Club.

Ouroube have qualified for the final match of the first ever Syrian Cup competition played during the 1959-1960 season. However, the match which was scheduled against the al-Jaish Club was never played.

The former basketball player and trainer Hrayr Muradian had served as club president for a period of 23 years, from 1985 until his death in 2008.

The best Syrian football player of the 20th century Avedis Kavlakian played for Ouroube during the 1950s.

Administration
Administrative Board of Ouroube SC:

{| class="wikitable"
|-
!Office
!Name
|-
|President of the Board
|Elie Sanossian
|-
|Vice-president
|Henry Arslanian
|-
|Member of the Board 
|Shahnour Muradian
|-
|Member of the Board
|Harout Muradian
|-
|Member of the Board
|Vrej Kurumlian
|-
|Member of the Board
|Jack Der-Khorenian
|-
|Member of the Board
|Jemma Badra
|-

Former notable players
Avedis Kavlakian
Hagop Avarian
Hovig Marash

See also
Al-Yarmouk SC (Syria)

References
 

Ouroube
Ouroube
Sport in Aleppo
1923 establishments in Mandatory Syria